At Your Threshold is a 1962 Soviet war drama film directed by Vasili Ordynsky.

Plot 
The action of the film takes place in the fall of 1941, when the fascists were approaching Moscow, and the Russians, in their turn, sent zenith batteries against them.

Cast 
 Nadezhda Fedosova as Mother
 Pyotr Lyubeshkin as Father
 Liliya Dzyuba as Liza (as Liliya Dsyuba)
 Boris Yurchenko as Mikhail Prokhorenko
 Yuri Gorobets as Perekalin
 Nikolay Grabbe as Chauffeur Mikhail Vasilyevich
 Roman Khomyatov as Igor Bersenev
 Viktor Filippov as Yevsei Vasyuta
 Georgy Martyniuk as wounded on the train

References

External links 
 
 

1962 films
1960s Russian-language films
Soviet war drama films
1962 drama films
Mosfilm films
Soviet black-and-white films
Soviet World War II films